Black Hand Inn is the eighth studio album by German heavy metal band Running Wild, released on 24 March 1994 through Noise Records. It is a loose concept album about a resurrected man, against a backdrop of piracy, foreseeing Armageddon.

Content 
The album's story starts with "The Curse", in which a man by the name of John Xenir (played by Rolf Kasparek) has been condemned to death for using forbidden powers and is burned at the stake to save his soul. After the fire burns out, all that is left is a blackened and charred hand.  In the title track, John is alive and creates his own inn in a grove with the sign of a black hand on the front door. He shows to his patrons his powers by predicting their futures. A priest happens to see his powers and threatens him, calling him a devil. However, John is unfazed and tells the man that long ago he was burned away and that the priest is really the evil one.

The lyrics of the song "Genesis" are based on the book "The 12th Planet" by Zecharia Sitchin.

Reception 
In 2005, Black Hand Inn was ranked number 394 in Rock Hard magazine's book The 500 Greatest Rock & Metal Albums of All Time.

Track listing 
All songs written by Rolf Kasparek

Personnel 
 Rolf Kasparek – vocals, guitar
 Thilo Hermann – guitar
 Thomas Smuszynsky – bass guitar
 Jörg Michael – drums

Additional Musicians
 Ralf Nowy – flute on "Dragonmen"
 Thomas Rettke – backing vocals

Production
 Rock 'n' Rolf – producer
 Charlie Bauerfeind – engineering, mixing, mastering
 Sascha Paeth – engineering (additional), programming
 Marisa Jacobi – layout, typography
 Karl-Ulrich Walterbach – executive producer
 Andreas Marschall – cover art

Charts

References 

1994 albums
Running Wild (band) albums